Decho is an omelette of Filipino origin, and has Japanese and Chinese influences. It is a regional dish of Cavite, Philippines. While Decho can be described as an omelette, it is also an alternate form of a dumpling. It consists of a small egg omelette outside, and inside it is a pork filling mixed with soy sauce and corn starch. It is simmered in a water, soy sauce, sugar, corn starch, oyster flavored sauce, sesame oil, and green onion broth.

Origin 

Areas like Cavite were greatly influenced by the foreign countries that occupied the Philippines during various wars. Food recipes especially were altered and influenced by the newcomers’ traditions and cultures. Spam and canned corned beef for example are prevalent in certain areas of the Philippines due to the Americans occupation during World War II, during which they exchanged their canned rations with the Filipinos for fresh food (vegetables, eggs, fruits, milk, pork, and chicken).

Sesame and soy flavoring are often found in Japanese and Chinese cooking. Dumplings are believed to have originated during the Eastern Han Dynasty in China, and then began to spread to different countries. While in China dumping were called jiaozi, in Japan they were referred to as gyoza, and in the Philippines, siomai.

History 

Decho was created in the Philippines, a relatively poor country. Due to the economic status of the residents, food was made with what was readily available, and relatively inexpensive. Most every Filipino food contains meat and/ or rice, which are two staples of the Philippines. Pork is one of the most commonly found (and available) meats there, second to chicken. Beef is not usually found.

The Philippines had already taken a Spanish recipe with Italian, Portuguese, and Hungarian influences from when Spain occupied them (until their defeat in the Spanish- American War of 1898), called Torta, and made it their own. Torta in Spain was a breakfast dish made in a skillet with eggs, potatoes, and meat, which were scrambled and then baked. The Philippines created their own take on this, making Torta with the same basic ingredients, but maintaining them as an omelette instead of a scramble.

Decho is a dish similar to this, but it is thought of as a dinner entree. It is not just a flat omelette like Torta, but an egg dumpling. Making it a dumpling is the fact that it's an egg omelette exterior forming a pocket, which is filled with the pork mixture. Decho and its broth are usually served over rice.

Philippine cuisine
Omelettes
Pork dishes
Stuffed dishes